Camp Lee Canyon is a district listed on the National Register of Historic Places containing seven buildings in Lee Canyon, Toiyabe National Forest in Mount Charleston.  The camp is operated by the Clark County Parks and Recreation department. Camp Lee Canyon was leased to Clark County Parks and recreation in 1961 from the US forest service. It is the only camp in control of Clark County Parks and Recreation.

History 
The camp was constructed in 1936 by the Works Progress Administration.

References

External links
Camp Lee Canyon Clark County

National Register of Historic Places in Clark County, Nevada
Buildings and structures in Clark County, Nevada
Works Progress Administration in Nevada
Historic districts on the National Register of Historic Places in Nevada